Craig Cleave (born 12 May 1963) is a former Australian rules footballer who played with Geelong in the Victorian Football League (VFL).

Cleave, a key defender, came from Leitchville in northern Victoria. He was centre half-back in Geelong's 1982 reserves premiership team. From 1982 to 1988, Cleave made 48 senior appearances for Geelong. The most he played in a season was 13 games in 1986, which would have been more had he not suffered a dislocated shoulder mid season.

References

1963 births
Australian rules footballers from Victoria (Australia)
Geelong Football Club players
Living people